Stamford American School Hong Kong is a private school in Hong Kong that offers K-12 international educational program with American standards-based curriculum for over 700 students from more than 30 nationalities in Ho Man Tin, Kowloon. Opened in 2017, Stamford offers Pre-Primary to Grade 12 for students aged 5 to 18. Stamford is authorized to offer International Baccalaureate (IB) Diploma Programme (DP) and is an authorized IB World School. Stamford American School Hong Kong is also a Council of International Schools (CIS) Accredited School.

History 
Stamford was established in Hong Kong in August 2016 by Cognita and opened its doors to its first cohort of students in September 2017. Stamford enrolled more than 350 students in its foundation year. In 2018, Stamford announced its on-campus facilities enhancement project to support the development of its high school curriculum; the project was completed in 2021.

Campus 
Stamford American School Hong Kong took over the former New Method College on 25 Man Fuk Road, Ho Man Tin, Kowloon, Hong Kong as its campus. The School was refurbished before opening and fitted with new facilities including a swimming pool and a technology lab.

References

External links 

 Official website

American international schools in Hong Kong
Private schools in Hong Kong
Ho Man Tin